Laurence A. Canter (born June 24, 1953) and Martha S. Siegel (April 9, 1948 – September 24, 2000) were partners in a husband-and-wife firm of lawyers who posted the first massive commercial Usenet spam on April 12, 1994. This event came shortly after the National Science Foundation lifted its unofficial ban on commercial speech on the Internet, and it marks the end of the Net's early period in some views, when the original netiquette could still be enforced.

Canter and Siegel were not the first Usenet spammers. The "Green Card" spam, however, was the first commercial Usenet spam, and its unapologetic authors are seen as having set the precedent for the modern global practice of spamming.

Green card spam
In early 1994, Canter and Siegel contracted with Leigh Benson to write a program to advertise on Usenet, but Benson was unable to write their software. In April 1994 they used a Perl script written by a programmer known only as "Jason", to generate advertisements for their service of enrolling people in a "green card lottery". This US government program allocates a limited quantity of "green cards" to certain non-citizens, allowing them to stay and work in the country. The two lawyers offered to do the necessary paperwork for a fee.

Canter and Siegel sent their advertisement, with the subject "Green Card Lottery – Final One?", to at least 5,500 Usenet discussion groups, an enormous number at the time. Rather than cross-posting a single copy of the message to multiple groups, so a reader would only see it once (considered a common courtesy when posting the same message to more than one group), they posted it as separate postings in each newsgroup, so a reader would see it in each group they read.  Their internet service provider, Internet Direct, received so many complaints that its mail servers crashed repeatedly for the next two days; it promptly terminated their service. Despite the ire directed at the two lawyers, they posted another advertisement to 1,000 newsgroups in June 1994. This time, Arnt Gulbrandsen put together a software "cancelbot" to trawl Usenet and kill their messages within minutes. The couple claimed in a December 1994 interview to have gained 1,000 new clients and "made $100,000 off an ad that cost them only pennies".

On May 5, 1994, the couple established a company called Cybersell. They promoted themselves as experts in the then-new business of online retail and in February 1995 undertook the first known commercial spamming on behalf of clients (so-called "spam for hire"). They wrote a book titled How to Make a Fortune on the Information Superhighway: Everyone's Guerrilla Guide to Marketing on the Internet and Other On-line Services. In 1997, Martha Siegel published a revised version titled How to Make a Fortune on the Internet under her name only.

In 1997, the Supreme Court of Tennessee disbarred Canter in part for illegal advertising practices. William W. Hunt III, of the Tennessee Board of Professional Responsibility, said at the time that he believed it was the first time a lawyer had been disciplined for Internet advertising practices. Cybersell was dissolved by default in March 1998 after repeatedly failing to file annual reports or pay its incorporation fees.

See also 
 Cybersell, Inc. v. Cybersell, Inc.

References

External links
 Ben Delisle, Green Card Lottery – Last Call – 1994 Usenet post giving background on Canter and Siegel
 Wyn Hilty, How The Web Was Lost, 1996
 Ray Everett-Church, "The Spam That Started It All", Wired magazine, April 13, 1999
 Sharael Feist, "The father of modern spam speaks", CNET News, March 26, 2002
 John M. Moran, "The Spam Heard Around The World", Hartford Courant, June 30, 2002
 Neil Swidey, "Spambusters", The Boston Globe, October 10, 2003
 

American lawyers
Business duos
Married couples
Usenet spammers
Jewish American attorneys